The Kyiv National Theatre of Operetta is a theatre in Kyiv in Ukraine. It was founded in 1934.

External links
Kyiv Academic Operetta Theatre (Kyiv)

Opera houses in Ukraine
Theatres in Kyiv
1934 establishments in the Soviet Union
Theatres completed in 1934
Music venues completed in 1934
Institutions with the title of National in Ukraine